The following radio stations broadcast on FM frequency 80.2 MHz:

Japan
JOFV-FM at Osaka

References

Lists of radio stations by frequency